The 2016 Katowice Open was a women's tennis tournament played on indoor hard courts. It was the 4th edition of the Katowice Open and an International tournament on the 2016 WTA Tour. It took place at Spodek arena in Katowice, Poland, from 4 April to 10 April 2016.

Points and prize money

Point distribution

Prize money

Singles main-draw entrants

Seeds 

 1 Rankings as of 21 March 2016.

Other entrants 
The following players received wildcards into the main draw:
  Paula Kania
  Vera Lapko
  Anastasiya Shoshyna

The following players received entry from the qualifying draw:
  Ekaterina Alexandrova
  Viktorija Golubic
  Daniela Hantuchová
  Isabella Shinikova

The following players received entry as lucky losers:
  Jesika Malečková
  Valeriya Strakhova

Withdrawals 
Before the tournament
  Denisa Allertová → replaced by  Donna Vekić
  Anna-Lena Friedsam → replaced by  Stefanie Vögele
  Polona Hercog → replaced by  Klára Koukalová
  Anett Kontaveit → replaced by  Pauline Parmentier
  Monica Niculescu → replaced by  Romina Oprandi
  Agnieszka Radwańska (shoulder injury) → replaced by  Valeriya Strakhova
  Magdaléna Rybáriková (left wrist injury) → replaced by  Jesika Malečková
  Barbora Strýcová → replaced by  Kristýna Plíšková
  Alison Van Uytvanck (ankle surgery) → replaced by  Aliaksandra Sasnovich

WTA doubles main-draw entrants

Seeds 

 1 Rankings as of 21 March 2016.

Other entrants 
The following pairs received a wildcard into the main draw:
  Vera Lapko /  Aliaksandra Sasnovich
  Katarzyna Piter /  Kristýna Plíšková

Withdrawals 
During the tournament
  Karin Knapp (right ankle injury)

Champions

Singles 

  Dominika Cibulková def.  Camila Giorgi, 6–4, 6–0

Doubles 

  Eri Hozumi /  Miyu Kato  def.  Valentyna Ivakhnenko /  Marina Melnikova, 3–6, 7–5, [10–8]

References

External links 
 

Katowice Open
Katowice Open
2016
April 2016 sports events in Europe